This Is Wonderland is a Canadian legal comedy-drama television series that premiered on CBC on January 12, 2004. The series was created by George F. Walker, Dani Romain, and Bernard Zukerman.

The second season premiered on January 25, 2005, and the third season on November 23, 2005. On February 13, 2006, CBC declined to order a fourth season, effectively cancelling the show. The final episode aired on March 15, 2006.

Plot
Alice De Raey, played by Cara Pifko, a young criminal lawyer fresh out of Osgoode Hall Law School, is thrown into a chaotic justice system. She encounters characters ranging from the truly desperate to the bizarre. Alice, with a good-natured openness that cloaks a tenacious, committed spirit, finds herself on a journey that constantly tests her patience and compassion. Alice has a distinctive habit of muttering to herself.

Set in the courtrooms of Toronto's Old City Hall, cast regulars include Michael Riley, Michael Murphy, Michael Healey, Siu Ta, Eric Peterson, Janet-Laine Green and Kathryn Winslow. Jayne Eastwood and Ron Lea joined the cast in 2005.

In addition to Alice's education in the real world of low rent criminal justice, distinctive features of the Wonderland courtroom include respectful treatment of the mental health concerns of both defendants and the authority figures (judges and lawyers) faced with the contradictions of the system and the multicultural nature of Toronto society. Events in many of the characters' lives overwhelm their ability to emotionally cope and the shortcomings of the "blunt instrument" of the judicial system to address those situations are fully explored. Language and cultural barriers routinely figure into the course of justice, raising questions about the ability of the judicial system to respond to the needs of a changing society.

Cast and characters
 Cara Pifko as Alice de Ray
 Michael Riley as Elliot Sacks
 Michael Healey as James Ryder
 Siu Ta as Nancy
 Jayne Eastwood as Ronnie Sacks
 Michael Murphy as Judge Maxwell Fraser
 Eric Peterson as Justice Declan Malone
 Janet-Laine Green as Judge Serkies
 Alison Sealy-Smith as Judge Vaughn
 Tom Rooney as C.A. David Kaye
 Kathryn Winslow as C.A. Pamela Menon
 Gina Wilkinson as Anna-Lynn Monteal
 Sergio Di Zio as Marcus Weekes
 Angela Vint as Tamara Rogan
 Tony Nappo as C.A. Portella
 Yanna McIntosh as Zona Robinson
 Vik Sahay as Anil Sharma
 Ned Vukovic as Dr. Neuman
 Mung-Ling Tsui as J.P. Chan
 James Kidnie as J.P. Kranyek
 Ron Lea as Jack Angel

Broadcast
Within Canada, reruns of This Is Wonderland were broadcast on CBC's specialty channel Country Canada (later rebranded as Bold).

The syndication began airing on South African network M-Net Series on July 7, 2009. The series also became available on VisionTV.

Reception

Awards and nominations
During the series' run, four Gemini Awards were awarded to members of the cast. Michael Murphy (as Judge Maxwell Fraser) won Best Performance by an Actor in a Featured Supporting Role in a Dramatic Series in 2004 and 2005; Cara Pifko (as Alice DeRaey) won Best Performance by an Actress in a Continuing Leading Dramatic Role in 2005; and Michael Riley (as Eliot Sacks) won Best Performance by an Actor in a Continuing Leading Dramatic Role in 2005.

This Is Wonderland received twelve Gemini nominations, including Best Dramatic Series (in 2006).

Home media
The first season was released on DVD in Region 1 on September 6, 2005. Seasons two and three have not been released on DVD.

Streaming
In 2017, the series had been released online for free on Canada Media Fund’s Encore+ YouTube channel. The channel ceased operation as of November 30, 2022.

References

External links

  
  This is Wonderland at Muse Entertainment
 

2004 Canadian television series debuts
2006 Canadian television series endings
2000s Canadian comedy-drama television series
2000s legal television series
Canadian legal television series
Television shows set in Toronto
Television shows filmed in Toronto
Television series by Muse Entertainment
CBC Television original programming